Hi Hat is an unincorporated community and coal town located in Floyd County, Kentucky, United States. Its post office is still open.

History
A post office was established in the community, then known as Fed, in 1881. In 1943, the coal town was renamed for the Hi Hat Elkhorn Mining Company.

See also

References

External links

Unincorporated communities in Floyd County, Kentucky
Unincorporated communities in Kentucky
Coal towns in Kentucky